Witków  is a village in the administrative district of Gmina Szprotawa, within Żagań County, Lubusz Voivodeship, in western Poland.

The village has a population of 600.

References

Villages in Żagań County